Walter J. Haas is an American businessman and former president of the Oakland Athletics (1990–1992) and co-chairman of the Evelyn and Walter Haas Jr. Fund.

Biography
Haas was born the son of Evelyn (née Danzig) and Walter A. Haas Jr. He has two siblings: Robert D. Haas; and Betsy Haas Eisenhardt (married to Roy Eisenhardt).

Personal life
Haas married Julie Salles, a Roman Catholic, in a Unitarian ceremony in Sausalito, California. They have three children: Simone Haas Zumsteg, Charlotte Haas Prime, and Walter A. Haas III.

References

Haas family
American people of German-Jewish descent
Major League Baseball team presidents
Oakland Athletics executives
Living people
Year of birth missing (living people)
Newmark family